James Hynds Gillies (11 November 1861 – 26 September 1942) was an Australian engineer, metallurgist and inventor who pioneered hydro-electric power in Tasmania.

References

Australian metallurgists
Australian electrical engineers
1861 births
1942 deaths